Polydamas of Skotoussa (Polydámas, Polydámantos (ὁ Σκοτουσσαῖος)), son of Nicias, was a Thessalian pankratiast, and victor in the 93rd Olympiad (408 BC).

His size was said to be immense and the most marvellous stories are related of his strength (for example, how, without any weapons, he killed a huge lion on Mount Olympus, or how he stopped a chariot at full gallop). His reputation led Darius II of Persia to invite him to his court, where he performed similar feats.

In the end, Polydamas' strength could not prevent his demise. One summer, he and his friends were relaxing in a cave when the roof began to crumble down upon them. Believing his immense strength could prevent the cave-in, he held his hands up to the roof, trying to support it as the rocks crashed down around him. This gave enough time for his friends to flee the cave and reach safety, but Polydamas never got out and died.

Sources
Athletes' Stories-Perseus.Tufts.Edu
Ancient Library
Pausanias. Description of Greece, 6.5.4 - 6.5.9.
Diodorus, 9.14.2.

5th-century BC Greek people
Ancient Olympic competitors
Pankratiasts
Ancient Thessalian athletes